The 2009 Asian Women's Youth Handball Championship (3rd tournament) took place in Amman from 4 July–9 July. It acts as the Asian qualifying tournament for the 2010 Youth Summer Olympics in Singapore and the 2010 Women's Youth World Handball Championship.

Results

Final standing

References
www.handball.jp (Archived 2009-09-05)

External links
www.asianhandball.com

International handball competitions hosted by Jordan
Asian Women's Youth Handball Championship, 2009
Asia
Asian Handball Championships
Sports competitions in Amman